Steven Downs and James Greenhalgh defeated Neville Godwin and Gareth Williams in the final, 6–7(6–8), 7–6(7–4), 7–5 to win the boys' doubles tennis title at the 1993 Wimbledon Championships.

Seeds
The top seed received a bye into the second round.

  Steven Downs /  James Greenhalgh (champions)
  Neville Godwin /  Gareth Williams (final)
  Gustavo Kuerten /  Nicolás Lapentti (second round)
  Scott Humphries /  Jimmy Jackson (quarterfinals)
  Lars Rehmann /  Christian Tambue (quarterfinals)
  Sebastián Prieto /  Jimy Szymanski (semifinals)
  Ben Ellwood /  Sven Koehler (quarterfinals)
  Andrew Ilie /  James Sekulov (first round)

Draw

Finals

Top half

Bottom half

References

External links

Boys' Doubles
1993